Der jüdische Arbeiter, German for "The Jewish Worker", may refer to:

 Der jüdische Arbeiter (Vienna), a German-language periodical
 Der yidisher arbeyter (Paris), a Yiddish-language periodical
 Der yidisher arbeyter (Vilna), a Yiddish-language periodical